Mason County is the name of several counties in the United States:

 Mason County, Illinois
 Mason County, Kentucky, originally Mason County, Virginia (1788–1792)
 Mason County, Michigan
 Mason County, Texas
 Mason County, Washington 
 Mason County, West Virginia, originally Mason County, Virginia (1804–1863)